Niyi Ojuolape (born Edward Adeniyi Ojuolape) is a Nigerian diplomat, international development consultant and the United Nations Population Fund’s UNFPA Country Representative to Somalia. He served as UNFPA’s envoy to Ghana between July 2017 and May 2022.

Early life and education
Ojuolape was born in Akure, Ondo State, Nigeria. His father, Justice Edward Ojuolape, is a retired High Court judge of the Federal Republic of Nigeria. Ojuolape holds a Master of Science degree in finance from the University of Calabar and a banking and finance degree from Ondo State University in Nigeria. Ojuolape also holds a Masters from Bocconi University Italy in the Management of International Organizations and was named the valedictorian of the 2019 class.

Early career
Ojuolape held the position of chief programme officer of donor coordination for the National Agency for the Control of AIDS (NACA) in Nigeria,  where he coordinated the communications, donor activities and the development of resource mobilisation strategies that led to an increase of $150 million in funding for the Agency's portfolio over a five-year period. He has also worked as the special assistant to the Minister of Health in Nigeria – Late Babatunde Osotimehin. He played an integral role in the success of the Ministry of Health's supervision of approximately 4000 staff members and a budget of about $1.2 billion. He also worked on several World Bank funded projects between 2002 and 2005.

United Nations Population Fund
Ojuolape was appointed as the UNFPA resident representative in Somalia in May 2022 Following an almost five years tenure as country representative of the UNFPA in Ghana. Niyi resumed in the same capacity in the organization’s country office in Somalia. His credentials was officially received by Acting Foreign Minister and State Minister for Foreign Affairs and International Cooperation, H.E. Mr. Balal Mohamed Osman on 20 June 2022, marking the start of his tenure in Somalia.[ 

He has mainstreamed youth issues, zero gender-based violence, and comprehensive sexuality education (CSE), as core strands of the organisation.

Prior to this role, he served as the country representative for UNFPA Ghana,he served as UNFPA's Chief of Staff at the Headquarters in New York and before that, as the Special Assistant to the Executive Director, Babatunde Osotimehin. He also served as the Deputy Representative of UNFPA in the Democratic Republic of Congo, liaising with political influencers within government, colleagues and Development Partners for the initiation of the landmark advocacy on Demographic Dividend.

As the UNFPA Country Representative in Ghana, he initiated several youth-centric and gender-inclusive programmes. Of note is the Youth Leaders (YoLe) Fellowship Programme which is partly implemented by Impact Hub Accra. The programme selects 16 graduates from Ghanaian tertiary institutions annually following rigorous screening, to intern at the UNFPA Ghana country office where they develop several skills ranging from: innovation, youth and gender advocacy and community development. Consequent on this, he led the completion of a youth innovation hub named ‘The Orange Loft’, and which was commissioned in June 2019 by Natalia Kanem, Executive Director of United Nations Population Fund.

Ojuolape is a member of the Advisory Board of the Coalition of People against Sexual and Gender Based Violence and Harmful Practices (CoPASH), a joint initiative of the Second Lady of the Republic of Ghana, H.E. Samira Bawumia and UNFPA Ghana. He has leveraged on the relevant public institutions like the Domestic Violence and Victims Support Unit (DOVVSU) and Faith-Based Organisations to increase awareness about GBV in Ghana and build capacity for improved response.

References

1970 births
Living people
University of Calabar alumni